Dioryctria hodgesi is a species of snout moth in the genus Dioryctria. It was described by Herbert H. Neunzig in 2003 and is known from Nevada and south-eastern California in the United States.

The larvae possibly feed on Pinus monophylla.

References

Moths described in 2003
Endemic fauna of the United States
hodgesi